Melanochlamys is a genus of headshield slugs in the family Aglajidae. Despite the appearance of its species, this genus  must not be confused with nudibranchs.

This genus was first described by Cheeseman in 1881 but later malacologists considered it a junior synonym of Aglaja Renier, 1807, until the genus was reinstated by Rudman in 1972 

It differs from the other genera in Aglajidae by its external cylindrical body form with small parapodia, the shape of its  small, curved and strongly calcified shell, its  alimentary canal with a rigid, non-eversible buccal bulb, and the reproductive system with a short duct to the exogenous ( = originating from the outside) sperm sac and a characteristic penis.

Species
According to the World Register of Marine Species (WoRMS), this genus contains the following accepted names:
 Melanochlamys algirae (Adams A. in Sowerby G.B. II, 1850)
 Melanochlamys aquilina S.-Q. Zhang, M.-J. Liao, Y.-G. Wang, M. Kong & B. Li, 2020
 Melanochlamys barryi Gosliner, 1990 
 Melanochlamys chabanae Breslau, Valdés & Chichvarkhin, 2016
 Melanochlamys cylindrica Cheeseman, 1881
 Melanochlamys diomedea (Bergh, 1893)
 Melanochlamys ezoensis (Baba, 1957)
 Melanochlamys fukudai Cooke, Hanson, Hirano, Ornelas-Gatdula, Gosliner, Chernyshev & Valdés, 2014
 Melanochlamys handrecki Burn, 2010
 Melanochlamys kohi Cooke, Hanson, Hirano, Ornelas-Gatdula, Gosliner, Chernyshev & Valdés, 2014
 Melanochlamys lorrainae (Rudman, 1968)
 Melanochlamys maderensis (Watson, 1897)
 Melanochlamys miqueli (Pelorce, Horst & Hoarau, 2013)
 Melanochlamys papillata Gosliner, 1990
 Melanochlamys queritor (Burn, 1957)
 Melanochlamys wildpretii Ortea, Bacallado & Moro, 2003

Species brought into synonymy 
 Melanochlamys depicta (Renier, 1807): synonym of Philinopsis depicta (Renier, 1807)
 Melanochlamys dubia (O'Donoghue, 1929): synonym of Philinopsis dubia (O'Donoghue, 1929)
 Melanochlamys nana (Steinberg & Jones, 1960): synonym of Melanochlamys diomedea (Bergh, 1894)
 Melanochlamys seurati (Vayssière, 1926): synonym of Melanochlamys algirae (Adams A. in Sowerby G.B. II, 1850)
 Melanochlamys virgo (Rudman, 1968): synonym of Philinopsis virgo (Rudman, 1968)

References

Vaught, K.C. (1989). A classification of the living Mollusca. American Malacologists: Melbourne, FL (USA). . XII, 195 pp
 Gofas, S.; Le Renard, J.; Bouchet, P. (2001). Mollusca, in: Costello, M.J. et al. (Ed.) (2001). European register of marine species: a check-list of the marine species in Europe and a bibliography of guides to their identification. Collection Patrimoines Naturels, 50: pp. 180–213
 Rolán E., 2005. Malacological Fauna From The Cape Verde Archipelago. Part 1, Polyplacophora and Gastropoda
 Pelorce J., Horst D. & Hoarau A., 2013, 2012. Une nouvelle espèce de la famille Aglajidae (Gastropoda: Opisthobranchia) des côtes de Méditerranée française. Iberus 31(2): 165-170

External links
 Adams, H. & Adams, A. (1853-1858). The genera of Recent Mollusca; arranged according to their organization. London, van Voorst. Vol. 1: xl + 484 pp.; vol. 2: 661 pp.; vol. 3: 138 pls.
  Rudman, W.B. (1972) On Melanochlamys Cheeseman, 1881, a genus of the Aglajidae (Opisthobranchia: Gastropoda). Pacific Science, 26(1): 50-62, 8 figs.
 Cheeseman T.F. 1881. On a new genus of Opisthobranchiate Mollusca. Transactions and Proceedings of the Royal Society of New Zealand, 13: 224
 Zamora-Silva A. & Malaquias M.A.E. (2018 - nomenclatural availability: 2017). Molecular phylogeny of the Aglajidae head-shield sea slugs (Heterobranchia: Cephalaspidea): new evolutionary lineages revealed and proposal of a new classification. Zoological Journal of the Linnean Society. 183(1): 1-51

Aglajidae
Taxa named by Thomas Frederic Cheeseman